Achatinella bulimoides is a species of air-breathing land snail, a terrestrial pulmonate gastropod mollusk in the family Achatinellidae. This species is endemic to Hawaii.

Shell description
The dextral or sinistral shell is ovate-oblong and subventricose. The shell has  whorls. The shell is similar in form to Achatinella livida, but the spire is less thickened and more pointed at the apex. The color is whitish with chestnut bands, and the apex is pale brown. The ground-color, in some specimens, is pale chestnut or ferruginous, banded with darker
shades. Other specimens are pure white. The aperture is white. The suture is scarcely if at all margined by a groove.

The height of the shell is 21.3 mm. The width of the shell is 11.8 mm.

Achatinella rosea
Achatinella rosea Swainson, 1828 is a variety of Achatinella bulimoides. Its sinistral shell is a pale, rose color, with two obsolete white bands. The shell has  whorls. The margin of the lip and columella are of a deeper rose-color, and the aperture white. It should be observed that the subsutural groove is very distinct. The height of the shell is 22.3 mm. The width of the shell is 13.5 mm.

References
This article incorporates public domain text (a public domain work of the United States Government) from reference.

bulimoides
Molluscs of Hawaii
Endemic fauna of Hawaii
Critically endangered fauna of the United States
Gastropods described in 1828
Taxonomy articles created by Polbot
ESA endangered species